WRHU (88.7 FM) is a college radio station licensed to Hempstead, New York, owned and operated by Hofstra University and broadcasting an eclectic radio format.

Since the 2010–11 NHL season, WRHU has been the radio home of New York Islanders games. Current Hofstra students produce, engineer, and perform on-air duties on all NY Islander game broadcasts alongside veteran NY Islander play-by-play announcer Chris King.

The station was named the National Association of Broadcasters' Non-Commercial Station of the Year in 2014, 2017, and 2019. It has also been ranked the number one college radio station in the country in The Princeton Reviews 2015 and 2016 college rankings.

Awards

2010s
 National Association of Broadcasters (NAB) Marconi Awards – College Radio Station of the Year - 2019 (award formerly Non Commercial Station of the Year)
 National Association of Broadcasters (NAB) Marconi Awards – Non Commercial Station of the Year – 2017
 National Association of Broadcasters (NAB) Marconi Awards – Non Commercial Station of the Year – 2014

2000s
 Society of Professional Journalists. Mark of Excellence Award Finalist – Best All-Around Radio Newscast – Newsline – 2010

Alumni

1950s
 Dan Ingram (a radio air announcer of the 1960s & 1970s on 77 WABC New York City and 1980s-2000s on 92.3 WKTU and 101.1 WCBS-FM New York City)
 Dick Maitland (multiple Emmy award-winning sound designer – Children's Television Workshop)

1960s
 Alan Colmes (top rated national TV and radio talk show host)
 John DeBella (long time highly rated radio host, WMGK Philadelphia)

1970s
 Steven Epstein (Grammy award-winning Senior Executive Producer / Sony Classical)

References

External links
 

RHU
Hempstead (village), New York
Hofstra University
Mass media in Nassau County, New York
Radio stations established in 1978